Eirik Ulland Andersen (born 21 September 1992) is a Norwegian professional footballer who plays as a midfielder for Eliteserien club Molde.

Career

Early career
Hailing from Haugesund, Andersen played for Vard Haugesund until he signed for FK Haugesund in 2010. He made his debut for Haugesund in Tippeligaen against Aalesund on 10 April 2011. Andersen played a total of 145 minutes in 10 matches for Haugesund in Tippeligaen in 2011, and scored five goals in three matches in the Norwegian Cup.

Andersen was loaned to his old club Vard Haugesund, playing in the 2. divisjon, until 31 July. On 1 August 2012, he joined Vard Haugesund on a permanent transfer. The club won promotion from the 2012 2. divisjon. He played for second-tier club Hødd from 2013 to 2016.

Strømsgodset
On 16 August 2016, he signed for Strømsgodset. He played 62 league games for the club and scored 20 goals.

Molde
Ulland Andersen signed for Molde on 16 January 2019. He signed a four-year contract with the club. He made his debut for Molde on 31 March 2019 in a 1–1 away draw against Sarpsborg 08. On 10 April 2019, he scored his first goal for the club on a penalty in Molde's 4–1 win against Vålerenga. On 1 May 2019, he scored his first hat-trick for the club in Molde's 5–0 win against Eide/Omegn in the Norwegian Cup first round. In the second half of the game, he was removed from the pitch with an injury to his Achilles tendon, which possibly rules him out for the rest of the season.

On 25 February 2021, he scored a brace in a 2–0 away win over TSG 1899 Hoffenheim in the 2020–21 UEFA Europa League round of 32, to qualify with his team to the next round.

Career statistics

Club

Honours

Club
Molde
Eliteserien: 2019
Norwegian Cup: 2021–22

Personal life
Ulland Andersen has a danish father and was born in Randers, Denmark. He lived in Denmark until he was ten years old. He is the younger brother of the footballer Andreas Ulland Andersen.

References

1992 births
Living people
People from Randers
People from Haugesund
Norwegian footballers
SK Vard Haugesund players
FK Haugesund players
IL Hødd players
Strømsgodset Toppfotball players
Molde FK players
Eliteserien players
Norwegian First Division players
Association football midfielders
Sportspeople from Rogaland